Prigorodny District is an administrative and municipal district (raion), one of the eight in the Republic of North Ossetia–Alania, Russia. It is located in the east of the republic. Its administrative center is the rural locality (a selo) of Oktyabrskoye. Population:  102,990 (2002 Census);  The population of Oktyabrskoye accounts for 9.6% of the district's total population.

History
Unlike the rest of the republic where Ossetians account for the majority of the population, the district has a significant Ingush population. The district in its eastern part is considered a troublesome zone of the republic due to the high tensions between the Ingush and Ossetians. Due to the North Caucasian conflicts it is now Ossetian-majority.

The eastern part of Prigorodny District used to be a part of Ingushetia (which was a part of the Chechen-Ingush ASSR at the time), but it was transferred to North Ossetia in 1944 after Stalin accused the Ingush of collaborating with the Nazis, deported the entire population to Central Asia, and dissolved the autonomy. This led to the present-day tensions, which started after the dissolution of the Soviet Union.

Notable people
 Issa Kodzoev (1938-), Ingush politician, writer, poet, playwright

References

Notes

Sources

External links
Ossetia-Ingushetia
Getting Back Home? Towards Sustainable Return of Ingush Forced Migrants and Lasting Peace in Prigorodny District of North Ossetia

Districts of North Ossetia–Alania